Anime Los Angeles (stylized as Animé Los Angeles) is an annual four-day anime convention held during January at the Long Beach Convention and Entertainment Center in Long Beach, California.

Programming
The convention typically offers an AMV contest, artists' alley, con suite, cosplay chess, dealers room, a gaming room, karaoke, manga lounge, and masquerade.

History
The convention moved from the Los Angeles Airport Marriott to the Ontario Convention Center in 2016. This move was made to accommodate the convention's growth. Anime Los Angeles 2021 was cancelled due to the COVID-19 pandemic. In 2022, the convention will move to the Long Beach Convention and Entertainment Center.

Event history

References

Other Related News Articles
Anime Los Angeles 2014 Anime News Network, Retrieved 24 November 2020

External links
 Anime Los Angeles Website

Anime conventions in the United States
Annual events in Los Angeles County, California
Conventions in California
Recurring events established in 2005
2005 establishments in California
Tourist attractions in Los Angeles County, California
Culture of Long Beach, California
Tourist attractions in Long Beach, California